Astonia is a monotypic  genus in the family Alismataceae containing the sole species  Astonia australiensis found in Queensland, Australia. It is sometimes included in the genus Limnophyton. It was named in honour of Australian botanist Helen Aston.

References

Alismataceae
Alismataceae genera
Monotypic Alismatales genera
Aquatic plants
Flora of Queensland